Javier Loera Cervantes is a Democratic member of the Illinois Senate from the 1st legislative district since November 18, 2022.

Cervantes won the election to the 103rd General Assembly and was appointed during the 102nd to replace outgoing State Senator Antonio Munoz.

Early life, education, and career
Cervantes was born in the South Side area of Chicago. He graduated from Benito Juarez Community Academy and studied visual communications at International Academy of Design and Technology and labor studies at University of Illinois Chicago. He worked in the Service Employees International Union from 2006 to 2018. He worked as campaign manager for then-State Senator Antonio Munoz in the 2020 Illinois Senate election.

Personal life
Cervantes is currently engaged to his fiancee Dolores. He has a daughter, Madison, and a stepson, Lawrence. Once married, he will be son-in-law to his wife's father, Antonio Munoz, who served as State Senator for the 1st district before Cervantes.

Electoral history

External links
Senator Javier L. Cervantes (D) at the Illinois General Assembly website
By session: 102nd
Constituency website

References

21st-century American politicians
Hispanic and Latino American state legislators in Illinois
Illinois Democrats
Illinois state senators
Living people
People from Chicago
Year of birth missing (living people)